William Fitzgerald (August 6, 1799March 1864) was an American politician who represented  in the United States House of Representatives. He was also a slave owner.

Biography
Fitzgerald was born at Port Tobacco in Charles County, Maryland on August 6, 1799. In 1806, he moved with his father to Dover, Tennessee. He was educated in England and studied law. He was admitted to the bar at Dover, Tennessee in 1821. In 1822, he married Elizabeth Wells, who was born near Clarksville, Tennessee.

Career
Between 1822 and 1825 Fitzgerald was the circuit court clerk for Stewart County. He was a member of Tennessee house of representatives from 1825 to 1826. He was elected solicitor general of the sixteenth solicitorial district of Tennessee on November 25, 1826, which he held until he vacated the role on March 4, 1831.

Fitzgerald was elected as a Jacksonian to the Twenty-second Congress, which lasted from March 4, 1831 to March 3, 1833.  He was an unsuccessful candidate for re-election to the Twenty-third Congress in 1832. He moved to Paris, Tennessee and served as judge of the ninth judicial circuit of Tennessee from 1845 to 1861. In 1861, he was nominated as a representative from Tennessee's ninth congressional district to attend a peace conference in 1861 in an effort to prevent the pending Civil War; Isaac Roberts Hawkins was elected to that role.

Death
Fitzgerald died at Paris, Tennessee in March 1864 (age about 64 years). He was interred in Fitzgerald Cemetery near Paris, Tennessee.

References

External links

1799 births
1864 deaths
People from Port Tobacco Village, Maryland
Jacksonian members of the United States House of Representatives from Tennessee
19th-century American politicians
People from Paris, Tennessee
American slave owners